The Isle of Man national badminton team represents the Isle of Man in international badminton team competitions. It is controlled by the Isle of Man Badminton Association, the organization for badminton Isle of Man. The Manx team first competed in the Commonwealth Games in 2010.

The Manx team also competes in the biennial Island Games. The team have been runners-up twice in 2011 and 2013 and have achieved third place four times.

Participation in Commonwealth Games 
Mixed team

Participation in Island Games 
Mixed team

Current squad 
The following players were selected to represent the Isle of Man at the 2019 Island Games.

Male players
Tobey Cheng
Neil Harding
Matthew Nicholson
Steven Quayle
Nick Thornley

Female players
Kayleigh Callow
Kimberly Clague
Jessica Li
Philippa Li
Nicola Wilkinson

References 

Badminton
National badminton teams